Arabkishlak (also: Yakkachinor) is a village in north-west Tajikistan. It is located in Khonabad jamoat, part of the city of Isfara of Sughd Region.

References

External links
Satellite map at Maplandia.com

Populated places in Sughd Region